Union Home Mortgage is an American mortgage loan company based in Strongsville, Ohio. Founded in 1970, the company reports that it operates in 44 states plus Washington, D.C., with over $5 billion in annual lending volume. The company also reports that it has been named to the Inc. 500 list of fastest growing companies in America four times (2016–2019).

In October 2020, the company signed on as title sponsor of the Gasparilla Bowl, an annual college football bowl game played in the Tampa Bay area.

References

External links

Financial services companies of the United States
Mortgage lenders of the United States
Companies based in Ohio
1970 establishments in Ohio